Álvaro Jiménez is the name of:

Álvaro Jiménez (Guatemalan footballer) (born 1974), Guatemalan professional footballer
Álvaro Jiménez (Spanish footballer) (born 1995), Spanish professional footballer